Dimiter Skordev (born 1936 in Sofia) is a professor in the Department of Mathematical Logic and Applications, Faculty of Mathematics and Computer Science at the University of Sofia.  Chairman of the department in 1972-2000.  Doyen and pioneer of mathematical logic research in Bulgaria who developed a Bulgarian school in the theory of computability, namely the algebraic (or axiomatic) recursion theory. He was the 1981 winner of Acad. Nikola Obreshkov Prize, the highest Bulgarian award in mathematics, bestowed for his monograph Combinatory Spaces and Recursiveness in Them.

Skordev's field of scientific interests include computability and complexity in analysis, mathematical logic, generalized recursion theory, and theory of programs and computation.

Skordev has more than 45 years of lecturing experience in calculus, mathematical logic, logic programming, discrete mathematics, and computer science. He has authored about 90 scientific publications including two monographs, and was one of the authors of the new Bulgarian phonetic keyboard layout proposed (but rejected) to become a state standard in 2006.

Notes

References
 Dimiter Skordev
 Historical notes on the development of mathematical logic in Sofia

1936 births
Living people
20th-century Bulgarian mathematicians
21st-century Bulgarian mathematicians
Mathematical logicians
Bulgarian logicians
Bulgarian philosophers
Scientists from Sofia